Michael Harbold (born May 22, 1968) is an American sprint kayaker who competed from the late 1980s to the mid-1990s. Competing in three Summer Olympics, he earned his best finish of eighth in the K-2 500 m event at Barcelona in 1992.

References
Sports-reference.com profile

1968 births
American male canoeists
Canoeists at the 1988 Summer Olympics
Canoeists at the 1992 Summer Olympics
Canoeists at the 1996 Summer Olympics
Living people
Olympic canoeists of the United States